Ibrahim ibn Simjur (died 948) was a Samanid military officer from the Simjurid family.

Biography 
Ibrahim was the son of Simjur al-Dawati, the founder of the Simjurid family. Ibrahim is first mentioned as a deputy of the Muhtajid ruler Abu 'Ali Chaghani. In 945, the Samanid ruler Nuh I removed the governorship of Khorasan from Abu 'Ali, and instead gave it to Ibrahim. However, Abu 'Ali responded by rebelling; he managed to capture the Samanid capital of Bukhara and place Nuh's uncle Ibrahim ibn Ahmad on the throne.

Abu 'Ali also forced Ibrahim and another Turkic military officer Mansur ibn Qara-Tegin to leave Nishapur. The two then went to Merv, where Nuh was preparing a counter-attack against Abu 'Ali. Nuh eventually managed to quell the rebellion and Ibrahim shortly died himself in 948 and was succeeded by Mansur ibn Qara-Tegin as the governor of Khorasan. Ibrahim had a son named Abu'l-Hasan Simjuri, who became even more prominent than his father.

Sources
 
 
 
Treadwell, Luke. "Simjurids." Encyclopaedia Iranica. Ed. Ehsan Yarshater. Columbia University. Retrieved 9 June 2014.

948 deaths
Year of birth unknown
10th-century Turkic people
Samanid generals
Samanid governors of Khorasan
Simjurids